was the fortified residence of the Ōuchi clan in Yamaguchi, Japan. Ōuchi-shi Yakata has been designated as a National Historic Sites along with Ryōun-ji temple.

It was a base of the Ōuchi clan who were feudal lords and thrived during the Muromachi period to Sengoku period. Its ruins have been protected as 
In 1556, Ōuchi Yoshinaga built Kōnomine Castle as a supporting castle of Ōuchi-shi Yakata because Ōuchi-shi Yakata was considered unsuitable for withstanding a siege.  but Mōri Motonari`s army advanced to Suō Province, Ōuchi Yoshinaga left Ōuchi-shi Yakata and Kōnomine Castle without resistance.

The castle was listed as one of the Continued Top 100 Japanese Castles in 2017.

Gallery

References

Castles in Yamaguchi Prefecture
Historic Sites of Japan
Former castles in Japan
Ruined castles in Japan
14th-century establishments in Japan
Ōuchi clan